Arbroath Catherine Street railway station served the town of Arbroath, Angus, Scotland from 1839 to 1848 on the Arbroath and Forfar Railway.

History 
The station opened on 3 January 1839 by the Aberdeen Railway. A goods line continued to the east that served Arbroath Harbour. There was also a trainshed and a locomotive shed. The station closed on 1 February 1848 but it remained open as a goods shed.

References

External links 

Disused railway stations in Angus, Scotland
Railway stations in Great Britain opened in 1839
Railway stations in Great Britain closed in 1848
1839 establishments in Scotland
1848 disestablishments in Scotland